The 2013–14 season was Partick Thistle's first season back in the top flight of Scottish football after a nine-year absence and the first in the newly established Scottish Premiership, having been promoted from the Scottish First Division at the end of the 2012–13 season.  Partick Thistle also competed in the League Cup and the Scottish Cup.

Results and fixtures

Pre Season

Scottish Premiership

Scottish League Cup

Scottish Cup

Player statistics

Squad
Last updated 4 May 2014

|}

Disciplinary record
Includes all competitive matches.
Last updated 4 May 2014

Team statistics

League table

Division summary

Management statistics
Last updated on 4 May 2014

Transfers

Players in

Players out

Contract extensions
The following players extended their contracts with the club over the course of the season.

Notes

References

Partick Thistle
Partick Thistle F.C. seasons